Sergey Krushevskiy (Russian: Сергей Крушевский; born 19 May 1976, in Tashkent) is a former Uzbek cyclist.

Major results
Sources:

2001
 1st Stages 3 & 4 Vuelta a Navarra
 2nd Trofeo Città di San Vendemiano
 4th Overall Giro Ciclistico d'Italia
2002
 National Road Championships
1st  Road race
1st  Time trial
 Asian Cycling Championships
1st  Road race
3rd  Time trial
 1st Tour de la Somme
 9th Tallinn–Tartu GP
2003
 National Road Championships
1st  Road race
1st  Time trial
 4th GP de Villers-Cotterêts
2004
 1st  Overall Tour de la Somme
 3rd Boucles de l'Aulne
2005
 2nd GP de Dourges
 6th Grand Prix de Beuvry-la-Forêt

References

1976 births
Living people
Uzbekistani male cyclists
Asian Games medalists in cycling
Cyclists at the 1998 Asian Games
Cyclists at the 2002 Asian Games
Medalists at the 2002 Asian Games
Asian Games gold medalists for Uzbekistan
Asian Games bronze medalists for Uzbekistan
20th-century Uzbekistani people
21st-century Uzbekistani people